Trend Records was a post-World War II United States jazz record label.

Trend's back catalogue was purchased by Albert Marx, an authority on jazz music and entrepreneur who  founded Discovery Records in 1948, and much of its material was reissued in the 1980s. Among those who recorded for Trend are Van Alexander, Robert Conti, Shelly Manne, Clare Fischer, Warm Dust, Dick Berk, Matt Dennis and Ray Linn.

See also
 List of record labels

External links
Trend Records on the Internet Archive's Great 78 Project

Defunct record labels of the United States
Jazz record labels